Swedish DJ Axwell, best known as a member of the Swedish DJ supergroup Swedish House Mafia, has received numerous awards and nominations. Among them include a nomination at the Grammis Awards, three nominations at the Grammy Awards, two Best House DJ awards won at the DJ Awards. He has appeared on the DJ Mag Top 100 DJs poll from 2006 to 2014.

DJ Awards
The DJ Awards organizes the annual electronic music DJ awards event it is the only international ceremony for DJs and also the oldest, the awards are held once a year at Pacha club in Ibiza Spain it is one of the most important accolades an artist can win or be honoured by.

Axwell has won the Best House DJ Award 2 times and been nominated 4 times.

DJ Magazine top 100 DJs

Grammis Awards

Grammy Awards

International Dance Music Awards

YouTube Creator Awards
Axwell (223 thousand subscribers - May 2020)

References

Axwell